Military relations between Israel and the United States have been consistently close, reflecting shared security interests in the Middle East. Israel is designated as a major non-NATO ally by the U.S. government. A major purchaser and user of U.S. military equipment, Israel is also involved in the joint development of military technology and regularly engages in joint military exercises involving United States and other forces. The relationship has deepened gradually over time, though, as Alan Dowty puts it, it was "not a simple linear process of growing cooperation, but rather a series of tendentious bargaining situations with different strategic and political components in each."

Israel is the largest cumulative recipient of U.S. foreign aid: until February 2022, the United States had provided Israel US$ 150 billion (non-inflation-adjusted) in bilateral assistance. In 1999, the US government signed a Memorandum of Understanding through which it committed to providing Israel with at least US$2.67 billon in military aid annually, for the following ten years; in 2009, the annual amount was raised to US$3 billion; and in 2019, the amount was raised again, now standing at a minimum of US that the US is committed to providing Israel each year.

In addition, the only foreign military installations on Israeli soil are US bases, including an AN/TPY-2 early missile warning radar station on Mt. Keren.

Overview

Following the Second World War, the “new postwar era witnessed an intensive involvement of the United States in the political and economic affairs of the Middle East, in contrast to the hands-off attitude characteristic of the prewar period. "[U]nder Truman the United States had to face and define its policy in all three sectors that provided the root causes of American interests in the region: the Soviet threat, the birth of Israel, and petroleum.”

During the first twenty years following Israel's independence, United States policy in the Middle East was driven by two major policy concerns: The prevention of an arms race in the Near East, and the prevention of the spread of Soviet influence. The Truman Administration promulgated the Tripartite Declaration of 1950 for these reasons, as well as to guarantee the territorial status quo determined by 1949 Armistice Agreements. Israel's main military patron at the time was France, which supported Israel by providing it with advanced military equipment and technology, such as the Dassault Mystère fighter-bomber aircraft. Initially, the U.S. government resisted pressure by Israel and Arab countries in the region to sell them advanced weapons. In response to the supply of advanced fighter aircraft by the USSR to Iraq and the United Arab Republic, the U.S. government agreed to sell MIM-23 Hawk anti-aircraft missiles to Israel in 1962, as a "specific action designed to meet a specific situation" which "by no means constitutes change in U.S. policy in area.". The Hawk system was approved on the grounds that it was a "purely defensive" weapon. Later, when Jordan threatened to turn to the USSR for weapons, the U.S. agreed to sell tanks and jet aircraft to Jordan in order to prevent the spread of Soviet influence, and in return, agreed to sell similar systems to Israel.

During the early 1960s, the U.S. government sought to establish a regional arms limitation agreement in the Middle East. The initiative lost steam in early 1965 after it was disclosed that the U.S. had been indirectly supplying weapons to Israel via West Germany since 1962, under the terms of a 1960 secret agreement to supply Israel with $80 million worth of armaments. The remainder of the agreement was fulfilled publicly, following its disclosure by the U.S., with Israel receiving shipments of M48 Patton tanks in 1965 and A-4E Skyhawk attack aircraft in 1968.

U.S. policy changed markedly after the Six-Day War of 1967, in response to a perception that many Arab states (notably Egypt) had permanently drifted toward the Soviet Union. In 1968, with strong support from Congress, U.S. President Lyndon B. Johnson approved the sale of F-4 Phantom II fighters to Israel, establishing the precedent for U.S. support for Israel's qualitative military edge over its neighbors. The U.S., however, would continue to supply arms to Israel's neighbors, particularly Lebanon, Jordan and Saudi Arabia, in order to counter Soviet arms sales and influence in the region.

During the Yom Kippur War in 1973, the U.S. mounted a major airlift codenamed Operation Nickel Grass to deliver weapons and supplies to Israel. Over 22,000 tons of tanks, artillery, ammunition, and other materiel were delivered to aid the Israeli military in response to a large-scale Soviet resupply effort of the Arab states. The operation was paralleled by a large-scale sealift of some 33,000 tons of materiel and the transfer of 40 F-4 Phantoms, 36 A-4 Skyhawks and twelve C-130 Hercules transport aircraft to replace Israeli war losses.

Bilateral military cooperation deepened under the Ronald Reagan administration in the 1980s. In 1981, U.S. Secretary of Defense Caspar Weinberger and Israeli Minister of Defense Ariel Sharon signed the Strategic Cooperation Agreement, establishing a framework for continued consultation and cooperation to enhance the national security of both countries. In November 1983, the two sides formed a Joint Political Military Group, which still meets twice a year, to implement most provisions of the MOU. Joint air and sea military exercises began in June 1984, and the United States has constructed facilities to stockpile military equipment in Israel.

In 1987, the United States granted Israel the status of major non-NATO ally, enabling it to compete equally with NATO and other US allies for contracts and purchase advanced US weapons systems. Israel became the largest recipient of United States military aid in the world (see military aid and procurement below). In 1988, Reagan and Israeli Prime Minister Yitzhak Shamir signed a memorandum of understanding to formalize and perpetuate the work of the bilateral US-Israel military, security and economic working groups.

In an effort to prevent Israel from retaliating against Iraqi SS-1 Scud missile attacks during the Persian Gulf war of 1991, and thereby breaking up the US-Arab coalition, the US dispatched MIM-104 Patriot surface-to-air missile batteries to Israel. The effort met with very limited success, with less than 10% and perhaps as few as none of the Scuds fired against Israel intercepted successfully.

Under the Bill Clinton administration in the 1990s, the US government made efforts to bolster the Israeli government's military edge by allowing it to purchase $700m of the latest U.S. military equipment, including advanced fighters, attack helicopters and the Joint Direct Attack Munition system. A series of major joint military technology development projects was also instituted.

Further extensive military cooperation took place under the George W. Bush administration, with Israel placing major orders for F-16I multirole fighters. During the 2006 Lebanon War, the United States provided a major resupply of jet fuel and precision-guided munition to replenish depleted Israeli stocks.

Joint military activity

The United States and Israel cooperate closely in a number of areas of military activity.
The U.S. underwrites some of Israel's research and development of weapons, and has contributed significant amounts of money to Israeli defense projects such as the Merkava main battle tank and the IAI Lavi ground-attack aircraft. Israel is a participant in the F-35 Lightning II fighter development program and was offered access to the F-22 Raptor program, though it turned this down due to the high costs.

The U.S. and Israel also cooperate jointly on a number of technology development programs, notably the Arrow missile system and the Tactical High Energy Laser (also known as Nautilus).
The two countries carry out regular exercises together, including carrying out biennial exercises codenamed Juniper Cobra intended to test interoperability between the two militaries. In addition, the Israeli port of Haifa is the main port of call in the eastern Mediterranean for the United States Sixth Fleet, and Israel provides other logistical and maintenance support for U.S. forces in the region. The two countries also share intelligence and maintain a joint anti-terrorist working group, and in April 2007 their air forces committed to share information about mutually relevant procurements.

The United States has stored military equipment in Israel since the early 1990s and may store additional equipment in Israel when withdrawing from Iraq.

Currently the only active foreign military installations on Israeli soil are American bases, including an AN/TPY-2 early missile warning radar station on Mt. Keren.

War Reserves Stock Allies-Israel also known as War Reserve Stockpile Ammunition-Israel or simply WRSA-I was established in the 1990s and is maintained by the United States European Command. It is one of the United States' biggest War Reserves, located within Israel. Initially the WRSA-I stock had $100 million worth of reserves; however, prior to Operation Protective Edge the WRSA-I had nearly $1 billion worth of reserves, with an authorization to increase this to $1.2 billion. In 2014 with the passing of the 2014 United States—Israel Strategic Partnership Act, the US agreed to increase the stock to $1.8 billion.

The stock includes ammunition, smart bombs, missiles, military vehicles and a military hospital with 500 beds. These supplies are situated in six different locations throughout Israel. If needed, Israel could request to access the WRSA-I stock, but it would need to be approved by the US congress. During Operation Protective Edge, the US authorized Israel to access 120mm mortar rounds and 40mm grenade launcher ammunition. These munitions were part of a set of older items in the stock, and were due to be replaced soon.

In October 2012, United States and Israel began their biggest joint air and missile defense exercise, known as Austere Challenge 12, involving around 3,500 U.S. troops in the region along with 1,000 IDF personnel. Germany and Britain also participated.

Controversies

The close military relationship between the U.S. and Israel has engendered a number of controversies over the years. Operation Nickel Grass—the U.S. resupply effort during the Yom Kippur War—led to retaliation by the Arab states, as OAPEC members declared a complete oil embargo on the United States, provoking the 1973 oil crisis.

The United States stipulates that U.S. military equipment provided through the FMS program can be used only for internal security or defensive purposes. Consequently, after allegations were made that Israel had used cluster bombs for offensive purposes during the 1982 Lebanon War, the United States suspended shipments of cluster bombs to Israel. Similar allegations were made regarding Israeli use of weapons supplied by the U.S. in the course of the 2006 Lebanon War and the Palestinian intifadas.

American use of its military aid for political pressure on Israel, as well as the economic and strategic restrictions attached to it, has made some Israelis question the value of American military aid. Israeli columnist Caroline Glick has argued that Israel's interests may be best served by ending the military assistance, and urged her government to initiate a conversation on cutting back on the assistance package. Former Israeli Defense Minister Moshe Arens also opposes continued US aid, arguing that Israel no longer needs it. Several Israeli political parties, including National Union, oppose the aid and propose a gradual reduction in dependency on it.

The Kirk-Menendez-Schumer bill would for the first time commit the United States to provide "diplomatic, military and economic" support for offensive actions by Israel.

In January 2014, it was reported that Israel and the United States had been quietly discussing the prospect of ending US aid, with representatives from both countries agreeing at bilateral meetings that Israel no longer needs US military aid. According to Daniel C. Kurtzer, a former US ambassador to Israel, "we may be reaching a point that after discussion of how to assure the security and intelligence cooperation, we can actually phase out the security assistance".

Following the 2014 Israel–Gaza conflict, when the United States temporarily suspended arms shipments to Israel, Israel reportedly reassessed its views on US aid, particularly on the view that it could always depend on a US resupply during wartime, and initiated new weapons projects to reduce its dependence on US weapons in favor of locally-made ones.

Military aid and procurement 

In terms of total money received, Israel is the largest cumulative recipient of military assistance from the United States since World War II, followed by Vietnam, Egypt, Afghanistan, and Turkey. About three quarters of the aid is earmarked for purchases of military equipment from U.S. companies and the rest is spent on domestic equipment.

Since 1987, the U.S. has provided an average of $1.8 billion annually in the form of Foreign Military Sales (FMS), Foreign Military Financing (FMF) and funds to support research and development. A bilateral memorandum of understanding was signed in January 2001, at the end of the Clinton administration, under which defense aid was increased to $2.4 billion annually from $1.8 billion, while the $1.2 billion of economic aid would be eliminated. This was predicated on the basis of the defense aid being increased by $60 million per year until the full amount was reached in 2008, while the economic aid is decreased by $120 million per year until eliminated. In 2007, the United States increased its military aid to Israel by over 25%, to an average of $3 billion per year for the following ten-year period (starting at $2.550 billion for 2008, growing by $150 million each year). The package started in October 2008, when regular aid to Israel's economy ended. Officials have insisted the aid is not tied, or meant to balance, simultaneous American plans to sell $20 billion worth of sophisticated arms to its Arab allies in the region, including Egypt and Saudi Arabia. Former U.S. President George W. Bush assured Israeli Prime Minister Ehud Olmert that the U.S. would help keep a "qualitative advantage" to Israel over other nations in the region.

The United States is the largest single supplier of military equipment to Israel. According to the U.S. Congressional Research Service, between 1998–2005 the U.S. accounted for the vast majority of Israel's arms transfer agreements, accounting for $9.1 billion out of $9.5 billion worth of agreements. Israel deals directly with U.S. companies for the vast majority of its military purchases from the United States, though it requires permission from the U.S. government for specific purchases. Permission is not always automatic; for instance, in March 2000 it became known that the Israeli government had been refused permission to purchase BGM-109 Tomahawk missiles.

Israel has the world's largest F-16 fleet outside the United States Air Force. With the delivery of 102 F-16Is, scheduled through 2008, the Israeli Air Force will have a total F-16 inventory of 362, in addition to 106 F-15s.

In December 2016, the United States delivered the first two F-35 “Adir” stealth fighter planes, a version of the Lockheed Martin F-35 Lightning II, arrived to Israel, the first of its kind in the Middle East. In April 2017, the United States delivered an additional three to total five F-35 stealth fighters now operated under the Israeli Air Force  Israel was the first country outside of the United States to receive the F-35 and is expecting to receive a total of 50 over the coming years, achieving two full squadrons by 2022. This delivery is due to the strong partnership that the two countries had in the manufacturing of the fighter jet. Israeli technology, aerospace and defense companies played a pivotal role in the technological innovation giving the plane its immense capabilities. Eventually, Israel hopes to further accommodate its air force with the F-35B STOVL. Recent US Tomahawk strikes into Syria demonstrate that fixed airfields could easily be destroyed or temporarily be made unavailable. The F35B-model has both short take off and vertical landing capability, making it a strong threat in such a small region with constant warfare.

Foreign military sales 

Note: This is not a comprehensive listing of U.S. military sales to Israel.

FMS – Foreign Military Sales
DCS – Direct Commercial Sales
Source: "Facts Book: Department of Defense, Security Assistance Agency," September 30, 2005.

Foreign military financing 
Note: This is not a comprehensive listing of US ESF and military aid to Israel.

FMF – Foreign Military Financing (direct military aid)
ESF – Economic Support Fund (open-ended monetary assistance that can be used to offset military spending and arms purchases, as well as for non-military purposes)
Supplementals are special one-time grants meant as a complement to already allocated aid
NADR-ATA – Nonproliferation, Anti-Terrorism, Demining & Related Programs
Source: "Congressional Budget Justification for Foreign Operations," Fiscal Years 2001–2007.

U.S. military equipment in Israeli use 

This is not a comprehensive list. In addition to indigenously developed military equipment, Israel has made a number of procurements from the United States in recent years, including systems procured directly from U.S. manufacturers and ex-U.S. Forces equipment. The Israel Defense Forces also makes use of U.S. military systems not necessarily procured directly from the U.S. The list below includes U.S.-made weapon systems paid for from funding provided by the US, by Israel alone, or by a combination of funding from both nations. All data is from Jane's Sentinel Eastern Mediterranean 2007 unless otherwise stated.

Israeli military equipment in U.S. use 

There are few statistics available about Israeli arms sales to the USA. The following weapons are known to be in use by the American military.
 ADM-141 TALD (Improved Tactical Air Launched Decoy) – device used to protect U.S. warplanes from enemy fire.
 AGM-142 Have Nap "Popeye" – a standoff air-to-surface missile with precision guidance
 M120 mortar – A 120 mm mortar developed by Soltam Systems.
 B-300 / Shoulder-launched Multipurpose Assault Weapon (SMAW) – An anti-tank or bunker buster recoilless rifle developed by Israel Military Industries. The SMAW is based on the Israeli B-300.
 Cardom – A 120 mm "recoil mortar system" using modern electronic navigation, self-positioning, and target acquisition.
 Gabriel (missile) – A sea skimming anti-ship missile.
 SIMON breach grenade – A rifle grenade designed to breach through doors. A variant is currently in service with the United States army.
 LITENING targeting pod – A precision targeting pod designed to increase combat effectiveness of aircraft.
 International MaxxPro – An MRAP armored fighting vehicle.
 Samson Remote Controlled Weapon Station – A remote weapon system.
 IAI Kfir – An all-weather multirole combat aircraft formerly used by the US Navy for training purposes.
 DASH III helmet-mounted display – The first modern Western HMD, upon which the JHMCS was based.
 Uzi submachine gun – compact submachine gun primarily used by the Zim Integrated Shipping Services merchant marine and formerly the United States Secret Service.

See also
 Israel–United States relations
 United States foreign aid
 United States security assistance to the Palestinian Authority
 2012 US-Israel military exercise

References

 
United States
Bilateral military relations of the United States
Military
Military diplomacy